Circle of Ash Haunted Attraction is a  haunted attraction near Central City, Iowa, which runs seasonally for Halloween. It was opened in 2000 as Canfield's Frightmare Forest. It grew from a small haunted trail to a  event.  It moved from its original location in a botanical preserve to an unused warehouse, and subsequently to its present location at the Linn County Fairgrounds.

History
Frightmare Forest was a haunted trail attraction located to the northeast of Cedar Rapids, Iowa, which ran seasonally for Halloween. It was opened in 2000 by Chad Canfield as Canfield's Frightmare Forest, subsequently becoming an LLC run by an organized group of members. It was held in an actual forest, part of Rock Island State Botanical Preserve, on Preserve Lane near Cedar Rapids. It grew from a small haunted trail to a  event.
In 2009, all of the Frightmare Forest organization's property was packed up and moved to a warehouse at 412 7th Ave SE, in Cedar Rapids, becoming the Circle of Ash Haunted Attraction.  Since then, it grew to produce multiple productions per year, including on Valentine's Day Weekend, Independence Day Weekend, and Halloween season in 2011. 

In 2015, the attraction went dark for a year, returning in 2016 at its current location at the Linn County Fairgrounds.

As of 2017, Circle of Ash has resurrected the Frightmare Forest name, and applied it to one of their haunted attractions at the fairgrounds.  The attractions include an outdoor haunted trail: Frightmare Forest, an indoor haunted house: Circle of Ash, and a fog filled clown maze: Socko's Fun House, as well as laser tag and VR style games.

Attractions
This attraction features multiple experiences on one site.  The Circle of Ash is both the attraction's namesake and its indoor haunted house.  Frightmare Forest is a haunted trail experience, created outdoors in a wooded area.  Socko's Fun House is a maze attraction, according to the owners.  In common industry usage, a "haunted house" and a "maze" are the same thing.

References

Tourist attractions in Cedar Rapids, Iowa